Personal Nightmare is a horror adventure game developed and published by Horror Soft for the Amiga, Atari ST and MS-DOS in 1989. It was released digitally by Adventure Soft on July 2, 2009 on GOG.com.

Plot
The game focuses on a town where The Devil has invaded and the player has four days to eliminate all possessed citizens (led by a witch and a vampire) and finally purge the evil by defeating the Devil himself before he can take over.

Gameplay
The game makes use of a combination of text-based commands, clickable verbal commands and clickable objects to progress. A compass indicates which directions the player can travel. Much of the game's movement and actions are real-time based so there is a day and night cycle. The player's inventory can be viewed in the respective menu. There are many encounters that can kill the player (ideally at night time) unless the player performs a proper action to avoid them. Newer versions of the game omitted the encounters where the players gets garroted. The player loses the game if four days pass and all the required possessed citizens have not been killed and the devil has not been repelled.

Reception

Personal Nightmare was generally well-received, including the ratings of 87% by Zzap! (Amiga), 84% by Computer + Video Games (Amiga and Atari ST), 74% by CU Amiga (Amiga)  and 7/10 by Datormagazin (Amiga).

References

External links
Personal Nightmare at Atari Mania
Personal Nightmare at Lemon Amiga
Personal Nightmare at the Hall of Light

1989 video games
Adventure games
Amiga games
Atari ST games
DOS games
English-language-only video games
Games commercially released with DOSBox
1980s horror video games
ScummVM-supported games
Single-player video games
Fiction about the Devil
Video games about vampires
Video games developed in the United Kingdom
Video games about witchcraft
Adventure Soft games